Tutuba may refer to:

Tutuba Island, an island of Vanuatu
Tutuba language, the Oceanic language spoken on this island